Nasser Daoudou M'Sa (born 26 February 1998) is a French professional footballer who plays as a midfielder for Greek Super League 2 club Apollon Pontus.

Career
On 25 July 2018, Daoudou signed his first professional contract with FC Sion, for 3 seasons. Daoudou made his professional debut in a 4-2 win over FC St. Gallen on 29 July 2018.

Personal life
Born in France, Daoudou is of Comorian descent.

References

External links
 
 SFL Profile
 FC Sion Profile

1998 births
Living people
French footballers
French sportspeople of Comorian descent
JA Drancy players
FC Sion players
Apollon Pontou FC players
Swiss Super League players
Championnat National 2 players
Super League Greece 2 players
Association football forwards
French expatriate footballers
French expatriate sportspeople in Switzerland
Expatriate footballers in Switzerland
French expatriate sportspeople in Greece
Expatriate footballers in Greece